Tamila Khimich (born 13 September 1994) is a Ukrainian footballer who plays as a midfielder for Spanish Primera Federación club RCD Espanyol and the Ukraine women's national team.

Career
Khimich started his career in Spartak ShVSM Chernihiv then she moved to the main woman's team Lehenda-ShVSM Chernihiv in Chernihiv. Khimich has been capped for the Ukraine national team, appearing for the team during the 2019 FIFA Women's World Cup qualifying cycle.

International goals

Honours
Ukrainian Women's League
 Runners-up : 2011, 2013, 2015
Belarusian Premier League: 
 Winners : 2017, 2018, 2019
Belarusian Women's Cup:
 Winners : 2017, 2018, 2019
Croatian First Division: 
Runners-up: 2021
Croatian Cup:
Winners: 2021

References

External links
Tamila Khimich at BDFútbol
 
 
 

1994 births
Living people
Sportspeople from Chernihiv Oblast
Ukrainian women's footballers
Women's association football midfielders
Spartak ShVSM Chernihiv players
WFC Lehenda-ShVSM Chernihiv players
FC Minsk (women) players
RCD Espanyol Femenino players
Segunda Federación (women) players
Ukraine women's international footballers
Ukrainian expatriate women's footballers
Ukrainian expatriate sportspeople in Belarus
Expatriate women's footballers in Belarus
Ukrainian expatriate sportspeople in Croatia
Expatriate women's footballers in Croatia
Ukrainian expatriate sportspeople in Spain
Expatriate women's footballers in Spain